SM Center Dagupan is a shopping mall owned and operated by SM Prime Holdings. It is located at M.H. Del Pilar cor. Herrero Road, Dagupan, Pangasinan. It is the third SM Mall in Pangasinan, after SM City Rosales and SM City Urdaneta Central and the first SM Supermall in Dagupan.

History

References

Shopping malls in the Philippines
SM Prime
Buildings and structures in Dagupan
Shopping malls established in 2019